Eichhornia, commonly called water hyacinths, was a polyphyletic genus of the aquatic flowering plants family Pontederiaceae. Since it was consistently recovered in three independent lineages, it has been sunk into Pontederia, together with Monochoria. Each of the three lineages is currently recognized as subgenera in Pontederia:
 Pontederia subg. Cabanisia, which includes P. meyeri, P. paniculata (the Brazilian water hyacinth), and P. paradoxa
 Pontederia subg. Oshunae, which includes the common water hyacinth, P. crassipes
 Pontederia subg. Eichhornia, which includes P. azurea, P. diversifolia, P. heterosperma, and P. natans

Pontederia subg. Eichhornia is pantropical, centered in South America but with P. natans being endemic to continental Africa and Madagascar. The other three species are restricted to the Neotropics.

Description
Its species are perennial aquatic plants (or hydrophytes) with prostrate and densely branched stems. The inflorescences can have one to 30 conspicuously attractive flowers, mostly lavender to pink in colour, rarely white.

References

External links
 

Freshwater plants
Pontederiaceae
Commelinales genera
Historically recognized angiosperm genera